"The Fact Is (I Need You)" is a song by American R&B/soul singer/actress Jill Scott. It was released as a radio single in support of Scott's second studio album, Beautifully Human: Words and Sounds Vol. 2. It was the fourth and final single from the album. The track is also featured on her live album, Live in Paris+.

Charts

References

2006 singles
Jill Scott (singer) songs
2004 songs
Songs written by Jill Scott (singer)
Hidden Beach Recordings singles
Soul ballads
Contemporary R&B ballads
2000s ballads